Rafael Sari (Alghero, 1904 - 1978) was a popular Sardinian poet and writer in Catalan. He worked as a school teacher and archivist of Alghero. From 1929 onwards he regularly published, in newspapers and magazines in Alghero in the Algherese dialect of Catalan, articles and poems - several of which won literary awards. His poetry is of an intimate nature and his compositions are often put to music. He was also founder and first secretary of the Cultural Centre for Alghero, along with Rafael Catardi - which now runs 
the annual literary prize in Alghero which bears his name.

Bibliography 

 Rima, memòria, poesia ... with Domènec Guansé and Miquel Palau, Editex, 1958.

 Ciutat mia: (Pà di casa), Edizioni Della Torre, 1984.
 Ombra i sol: poemes de l'Alguer - 1980.

Notes 

1904 births
People from Alghero
1978 deaths
Italian poets
Italian writers